Ueno Yoshie (born Takamatsu, Kagawa Prefecture, Japan) is a female Japanese flautist. Ms. Yoshie is a multiple prize-winner who has performed in Japan before the emperor and empress, and also in the United States, Germany, France, Austria, Russia, Korea, China, and Taiwan.  she was based in Paris, France.

References

Japanese flautists
Living people
Year of birth missing (living people)
People from Takamatsu, Kagawa
21st-century Japanese women musicians
21st-century flautists